Brachytarsophrys feae (common names: Fea's horned frog, Fea's short-legged toad, Kakhien Hills spadefoot toad, and others) is a species of amphibian in the family Megophryidae. It is found in southern China (Guangxi and Yunnan) and northern Myanmar, Thailand, and Vietnam; it is likely to occur in Laos. The specific name feae honors Leonardo Fea, an Italian explorer, zoologist, and naturalist.

Description

Behaviour
Male Brachytarsophrys feae appear to be territorial. Their advertisement call is loud and can be likened to barking. Limited data suggest that chorusing occurs only in rainy nights; otherwise males remain hidden in their stream-side burrows.

Habitat and conservation
Its natural habitats are evergreen broadleaf forest and streams; it breeds in streams. It is threatened by habitat loss caused by dams and power plants, and it is also collected for consumption.

References

feae
Amphibians of China
Amphibians of Myanmar
Amphibians of Thailand
Amphibians of Vietnam
Amphibians described in 1887
Taxa named by George Albert Boulenger
Taxonomy articles created by Polbot
Taxobox binomials not recognized by IUCN